The 2010–11 Men's LEN Trophy was the second tier of European competition in water polo. It ran from October 2010 to April 2011.

Federation team allocation
Each national federation can enter up to two teams into the LEN Trophy. 16 additional teams eliminated from the qualifying rounds of the 2010/11 Euroleague are transferred to the Men's LEN Trophy.

Distribution

Teams

Round and Draw Dates

Tournament Phase

First qualifying round

Group A (Tbilisi)

Group B (Kotor)

Group C (Esslingen)

Group D (Koper)

Second qualifying round

Knockout rounds

Round of 16
....

Quarterfinals

Semifinals

Final

References

LEN Euro Cup seasons
Euro Cup
2010 in water polo
2011 in water polo
Sports competitions in Athens